The Batesville Historic District is a national historic district located at Batesville, Albemarle County, Virginia.  In 1999, when it was listed on the National Register of Historic Places, it included 33 buildings deemed to contribute to the historic character of the area. They include representative examples of the early-19th century Federal Style, the mid-19th century Greek Revival Style, simple late-Victorian styles from the late-19th century- and early-20th century, Classical Revival and Colonial Revival styles. Notable buildings include the Batesville Elementary School (1922), Batesville Public School (c. 1870), Mount Ed Baptist Church, Batesville Methodist Church (1861), Dr. Smith House, the Barskdale House, Hill House (c. 1900), and Page's Store (also known as the Charles Joseph Store and Batesville Store, c. 1900).

References

External links
Page's Store, Intersection of Route 692 & Route 635, Batesville, Albemarle County, VA: 1 measured drawing and 9 data pages at Historic American Buildings Survey
Mount Ed Baptist Church, State Route 635, Batesville, Albemarle County, VA: 7 measured drawings and 9 data pages at Historic American Buildings Survey

Historic American Buildings Survey in Virginia
Colonial Revival architecture in Virginia
Neoclassical architecture in Virginia
Historic districts in Albemarle County, Virginia
National Register of Historic Places in Albemarle County, Virginia
Historic districts on the National Register of Historic Places in Virginia